Mahanpur (also called Pakhru Ge da Graan ) is a small town and a newly created tehsil in Kathua district of Jammu Division in the union territory of Jammu and Kashmir, India. Earlier, Mahanpur was a town in Basohli tehsil. Mahanpur town is located about 50 km to the north of district headquarter Kathua and about 32 km south of the Sub Divisional headquarter Basohli.

Geography
Mahanpur (town) 919 has an area of 363 square kilometers. Mahanpur borders Bani and Duggan Tehsil to the north, Billawar to the west and Dharkalan to the south.

Places to visit 
 Ranjit Sagar Dam also called "Thein Dam"
 Sukrala Mata Temple
 Bala Sundri Mata Temple
 Dhole -joode Mata

Nearby places 
 Dalhousie, Kathua, Chamba.

See also
 Basholi
 Hiranagar
 Nagri Parole
 Bani

References 

Cities and towns in Kathua district